Joey Roggeveen (born 20 March 1998) is a Dutch football player who plays for Eerste Divisie club Jong Ajax.

Club career
He made his Eerste Divisie debut for Jong AZ on 12 October 2018 in a game against Jong FC Utrecht, as a starter. On 25 June 2021 it was announced that Ajax had signed Roggeveen on a 1-year contract for the reserves team' Jong Ajax as a free transfer from FC Volendam, competing in the Eerste Divisie, the 2nd tier of professional football in the Netherlands.

International career
Born in the Netherlands, Roggeveen is of Surinamese descent. He was a youth international for the Netherlands. He has been called up by the Surinamese National squad to participate in a friendly match against Thailand on March 27th, 2022.

References

External links
 
 

1998 births
People from Haarlemmermeer
Living people
Dutch footballers
Netherlands youth international footballers
Dutch sportspeople of Surinamese descent
Association football goalkeepers
Jong AZ players
SC Telstar players
FC Volendam players
AFC Ajax players
Jong Ajax players
Eerste Divisie players
Footballers from North Holland